Paul Robert Magocsi (born January 26, 1945, in Englewood, New Jersey) is an American professor of history, political science, and Chair of Ukrainian Studies at the University of Toronto. He has been with the university since 1980, and became a Fellow of the Royal Society of Canada in 1996. He currently acts as Honorary Chairman of the World Congress of Rusyns, and has authored many books on Rusyn history.

Born in Englewood, New Jersey, Magocsi (his surname Magocsi is pronounced something like "magótchy", varying in different languages) is of Hungarian and Ruthenian (Rusyn) descent. He completed his undergraduate studies at Rutgers University B.A. in 1966; M.A. 1967, Princeton University in M.A. 1969, Ph.D. 1972. He then went to Harvard University, where he was a member of the Society of Fellows between 1973 and 1976. In 2013, he was awarded doctor honoris causa by the University of Prešov in Slovakia.

Magocsi has taught at Harvard University and the Hebrew University in Jerusalem. In 1996, he was appointed permanent fellow of the Royal Society of CanadaCanadian Academies of Arts, Humanities and Sciences.

Besides his primary focus on East-Central European history, Magocsi is a scholar of nationality and ethnicity more generally, and edited the collection Aboriginal Peoples of Canada: A Short Introduction (2002).

Selected books and publications
Among his over 675 publications, some of the most notable are:

See also
Rusyns
Ruthenia

References

1945 births
Living people
21st-century American historians
21st-century American male writers
American people of Rusyn descent
Fellows of the Royal Society of Canada
Historians of Ukraine
Academic staff of the University of Toronto
Rutgers University alumni
Princeton University alumni
Harvard Fellows
American people of Hungarian descent
American expatriate academics
American expatriates in Canada
Slavists
Ukrainian studies
Scholars of nationalism
Ukrainianists
Rusyn people
American male non-fiction writers